dnaN is the gene that codes for the DNA clamp (also known as β sliding clamp) of DNA polymerase III in prokaryotes. The β clamp physically locks Pol III onto a DNA strand during replication to help increase its processivity. The eukaryotic equivalent to the β clamp is PCNA.

See also
 Beta clamp

References 

DNA replication